Andrew Thomson may refer to:

Andrew Thomson (academic) (1936–2014), British management education academic and historian
Andrew Thomson (kickboxer) (born 1974), South African kickboxer
Andrew Thomson (Canadian politician) (born 1967), Canadian NDP politician and minister, 1995–2007
Andrew Thomson (Australian politician) (born 1961), Australian Liberal politician and minister, 1995–2001
Andrew Thomson (author), New Zealand UN doctor and author
Rev Andrew Thomson (minister) (1814–1901), Scottish biographer
Andrew Thomson (Australian footballer) (born 1972), Australian rules footballer for Sydney Swans
Andrew Thomson (Scottish footballer) (1865–1936), Scottish international footballer
Andrew Mitchell Thomson (1779–1831), minister of the Church of Scotland

See also
Andy Thomson (disambiguation)
Andrew Thompson (disambiguation)